Loredana Errore (born 27 October 1984) is a Romanian-born Italian singer-songwriter. After participating in various singing competitions, she officially debuted in 2009 at the ninth edition of the Italian talent show Amici di Maria De Filippi, eventually reaching the finals and finishing in second place.

She signed a contract with record label Sony Music Entertainment, which allowed her to publish an EP called Ragazza Occhi Cielo in 2010. Over 60,000 copies were sold and it was certified platinum after three weeks. Errore lives with her adoptive family in Agrigento, the city from where she graduated.

Early career
Born in Bucharest, Errore started performing in school plays during the 1990s. She also participated in various singing competitions often placing at the top. In 2001, she was admitted to the final rounds of the Festival of Naples, winning a scholarship. In 2002, Errore took part in the selection of the National Academy of Sanremo Song, finishing in the top sixteen. In 2004, she won second place in the singing contest "Sing Me". In 2005, she composed and sang the song House of Joy for a Bialetti advertisement. Also that year, Errore was selected for the finals of the competition "Young Mia Martini". She traveled to Lampedusa, Bologna and London to practice and work with artists such as Mario Biondi, Roy Paci, Antonio Michel and Mughal. She has also performed at public venues and street parties.

Later career
On 26 September 2009 Errore competed on the talent show Amici di Maria De Filippi. While on the show, she caught the attention of Rudy Zerbi, president of Sony Records, who agreed to sign her to his label. She accepted, and was allowed to make and publish an EP, Ragazza Occhi Cielo, whose extracted singles are Ragazza Occhi Cielo, L'ho visto prima io and Oggi tocchi a me. The EP reached the third position of the Italian Almums Chart and it was certified Platinum.

On 8 March 2011 her first studio album L'errore was released, it reached number eleven on the Italian Albums Chart.

On 28 August 2012 her second studio album Pioggia di comete was released, it reached number four on the Italian Albums Chart.

Discography

Albums/EP

Singles
 Lame (2009)
 Ragazza occhi cielo (2010)
 L'ho visto prima io (2010)
 Oggi tocchi a me (2010)
 Il muro (2011)
 Cattiva (2011)
 Che bel sogno che ho fatto (2011)
 Una pioggia di comete (2012)

Awards and nominations

References

External links
Official website

Living people
Italian women singer-songwriters
Italian singer-songwriters
1984 births
Romanian emigrants to Italy
Musicians from Bucharest
21st-century Italian singers
21st-century Italian women singers
Italian people of Romanian descent